The movement to decriminalize psilocybin in the United States began in the late 2010s, with Denver, Colorado becoming the first city to decriminalize psilocybin in May 2019. The cities of Oakland and Santa Cruz, California, followed suit and decriminalized psilocybin in June 2019 and January 2020, respectively. Washington, D.C. followed suit in November 2020, as did Somerville, Massachusetts in January 2021, and then neighboring Bay State town Cambridge, near Boston, and Northampton, in western Massachusetts, in February 2021 and March 2021, respectively. Detroit Michigan in November 2021.Seattle, Washington became the largest U.S. city on the growing list in October 2021.

Supporters of the movement have cited emerging research that indicates potential medical uses for the drug. Oregon voters passed the 2020 Oregon Ballot Measure 109, making it the first state to both decriminalize psilocybin and also legalize it for therapeutic use. Colorado followed with the 2022 Colorado Ballot Measure 122. The use, sale, and possession of psilocybin in the United States is illegal under federal law.

Background

Psilocybin is a psychedelic drug produced naturally by psilocybin mushrooms, commonly known as "magic mushrooms". In the United States, it is federally classified as a Schedule I controlled substance that has "no accepted medical use and a high potential for abuse." The drug was banned by the 1970 Controlled Substances Act. In the 2005 case of State of New Mexico vs David Ray Pratt, New Mexico's Court of Appeals found that if one grows psilocybin mushrooms for personal use, it is not considered "manufacturing of a controlled substance" under state law.

In February 2019, Troy Farah of Wired reported on two grassroots movements in Oregon and the city of Denver, Colorado, that were pushing for the decriminalization of psilocybin. Advocates for decriminalizing psilocybin have formed their movement based on the rapid legalization of cannabis in the United States. Decriminalization efforts have not included synthetic psychedelics such as lysergic acid diethylamide (LSD) and MDMA. American author Michael Pollan, writing for The New York Times, criticized the movement for being a premature push, "before the researchers have completed their work". He wrote, "We still have a lot to learn about the immense power and potential risk of these molecules, not to mention the consequences of unrestricted use." At the same time, he urged that "no one should ever be arrested or go to jail for the possession or cultivation of any kind of mushroom." Pollan acknowledged the low risks of the drug's use, but cited a survey that nearly eight percent of people needed psychiatric treatment after experiencing a bad trip. His end goal however is legalisation not only for therapeutic use: "I look forward to the day when psychedelic medicines like psilocybin, having proven their safety and efficacy in F.D.A.-approved trials, will take their legal place in society, not only in mental health care but in the lives of people dealing with garden-variety unhappiness or interested in spiritual exploration and personal growth."

In May 2018, President Donald Trump signed the Right to Try Act, with certain doctors suggesting that it allows terminally ill patients to use psychedelics for treatment. In October 2018, the Food and Drug Administration granted psilocybin "breakthrough therapy" status for research. The drug was granted this status again in November 2019. Decriminalization advocates have cited research that suggests that the drug is non-addictive and causes a low amount of emergency visits when compared to other illegal drugs. Other research has indicated the potential beneficial use of psilocybin in treating treatment-resistant depression and nicotine dependence. Advocates have also claimed that decriminalization would redirect law enforcement's attention and limited resources from policing private psychedelic usage, to higher priorities affecting the general public (e.g. violent crime).

Legality

Decriminalization
In May 2019, Denver, Colorado, became the first city in the United States to decriminalize psilocybin mushrooms after an ordinance admitted to the ballot narrowly winning with 50.6% of the vote. The initiative did not actually legalize mushrooms, but prohibited Denver from spending any resources to prosecute people for their use or possession. The law applies to adults over the age of 21, and psilocybin remains illegal in Colorado. 

The following month in June 2019, thirty individuals testified to the city council in Oakland, California, about their prior experiences with psilocybin. Following the testimonies, the city council unanimously voted to decriminalize the drug, along with peyote. 

In January 2020, Santa Cruz, California, voted unanimously to decriminalize the adult possession and cultivation of psilocybin. Commercial sale of psilocybin is still illegal. 

In September 2020, the City Council of Ann Arbor, Michigan, voted unanimously in favor of a resolution declaring the investigation or arrest of anyone for planting, cultivating, purchasing, transporting, distributing, engaging in practices with or possessing entheogenic plants or plant compounds to be the city's lowest law enforcement priority.

In November 2020, the state of Oregon became the first U.S. state to both decriminalize psilocybin and also legalize it for therapeutic use after the Ballot Measure 109 passed. 

In November 2020, the District of Columbia passed initiative 81; the short title of the initiative was the Entheogenic Plant and Fungus Policy Act of 2020 and it came into effect on March 15, 2021. It decriminalizes psilocybin drugs, which are psychedelics including magic mushrooms, ayahuasca, and mescaline, making arrests for their possession or use the lowest priority for DC police. 

In January 2021, Washtenaw County, Michigan followed suit. That same month, the City Council of Somerville, Massachusetts voted unanimously to decriminalize the possession of entheogenic plants, including psilocybin mushrooms and ibogaine. 

In February 2021, after continuous outreach by Bay Staters for Natural Medicine, the City Council of Cambridge, Massachusetts, and in March 2021, Northampton, Massachusetts followed. 

In October 2021, the City Council of Seattle, Washington, and Arcata, California, voted unanimously to deprioritize enforcing entheogen prohibition. 

On October 20, 2021, the City Council of Easthampton, Massachusetts, voted 7-0 on a non-binding resolution to support ending arrests for the growing of entheogenic plants and fungi, as well as to support decriminalization of the possession of most controlled substances. 

On November 3, 2021, Detroit voters approved Proposal E, making Detroit the latest city to “decriminalize nature,” as supporters call it. Proposal E, a ballot initiative, passed with 61% of voters supporting a law that will, “to the fullest extent permitted under Michigan law,” make “the personal possession and therapeutic use of entheogenic plants by adults the city’s lowest law-enforcement priority.”  

On December 20, 2021, the City of Port Townsend, WA, adopted a resolution requesting that "investigating, arrest, and prosecution of adults engaging in entheogen-related activities, included but not limited to... should be a City of Port Townsend low enforcement priority when done in a nonpublic place."

On March 22, 2022, Hazel Park became the third Michigan city to decriminalize natural psychedelics. 

On September 7, 2022, San Francisco Board of Supervisors unanimously approved a measure calling for the decriminalization of the use of entheogenic plants.

In March 2022, Colorado activists picked a psychedelic reform initiative (Propostion 122) out of three other similar initiatives and started a signature campaign to place the measure on the state's 2022 election ballot. By July 2022 the reform initiative made the Colorado ballot for the 2022 midterm elections. The ballot initiative was passed in November 2022 by over 50% of those who voted. It decriminalizes the possession, growing, and sharing of five psychedelics for personal use; these being: psilocybin, psilocyn, dimethyltryptamine (DMT), ibogaine, and mescaline, for those aged 21-years-old and over. The initiative will also legalize "healing centers" that are licensed by the state’s Department of Regulatory Agencies, where those aged 21 and over can buy, consume, and take psychedelics under supervision. This healing center programme is expected to begin in 2024. It will at first only include psilocybin but allows for expansion to include DMT, ibogaine, and mescaline in 2026.

Medical use
On May 26, 2020, an initiative in Oregon to legalize supervised adult or therapeutic usage of psilocybin and also decriminalize it statewide qualified to appear on the ballot in November. On November 3, 2020, both measures were approved by voters in Oregon.

Ongoing efforts
A 2018 effort to decriminalize psilocybin in California failed to garner enough signatures. In February 2019, Iowa state lawmaker Jeff Shipley introduced two bills that would legalize medical psilocybin and remove the drug from the state's list of controlled substances. In June 2019, Representative Alexandria Ocasio-Cortez proposed legislation that would remove restrictions placed on researching the medical use of psilocybin. By November 2019, nearly 100 U.S. cities were reportedly considering measures to decriminalize psilocybin.

In January 2020, a Vermont state lawmaker, along with three other co-sponsors, introduced a bill to decriminalize psilocybin, peyote, ayahuasca, and kratom. On May 26, 2020, an initiative in Oregon to legalize medical psilocybin qualified to appear on the ballot in November. Another initiative in Oregon would decriminalize drug possession and expand treatment services. In May 2020, New York Assemblywoman Linda Rosenthal introduced a decriminalization bill, citing ongoing medical research and successful efforts in Denver, Oakland, and Santa Cruz, and filed further bills regarding psychedelics in the following years. In November 2020, New Jersey senator Nicholas Scutari added an amendment to a marijuana decriminalization bill that would decriminalize up to one ounce of psilocybin. In November 2020, California Senator Scott Wiener introduced a bill to decriminalize psychedelics such as psilocybin, ayahuasca, ibogaine, and LSD. 

In April 2021, the bill has been approved by the Senate Public Safety Committee and the Health Committee, and in May 2021, it was cleared by the Senate Appropriations Committee and approved by the California Senate. In June 2021, the bill was approved by the Assembly Public Safety Committee, and in July 2021, it was cleared by the Assembly Health Committee. In December 2022, it was re-introduced in a slightly modified form as Senate Bill 58, and does not include MDMA or LSD, which were both included in the earlier attempt under SB519. 

In September 2021, Michigan senators Jeff Irwin and Adam Hollier introduced SB631, which would create exemptions in the Michigan Health Code allowing personal and communal use, possession, cultivation, transportation and delivery of naturally occurring substances. It is also the first of "Decriminalize Nature" led efforts that would allow financial gain for services that utilize these substances. SB 631 currently sits in the Michigan Senate Judiciary and Public Safety Committee. 

In November 2021, activists are advancing reform among others in Grand Rapids, Michigan.

On January 5, 2022, Washington State legislators proposed Senate Bill 5660 which would legalize psilocybin for “supported use” among adults over 21.

For the 2023 session, lawmakers in eleven states are pursuing psychedelics reform legislation.

Public opinion
In January 2019, the Oregon Psilocybin Society and research firm DHM Research found that 47 percent of Oregon voters supported the legalization of medical psilocybin, while 46 percent opposed it. The percentage of voters in favor increased to 64 percent after key elements of the ballot were clarified to the poll's participants. In November 2020, a ballot measure to legalize medical psilocybin passed with 55.8% of voters in favor.

An October 2019 online poll conducted by research firm Green Horizons found that 38 percent of U.S. adults supported legalizing psilocybin "under at least some circumstances."

According to a survey in Washington D.C., done at the beginning of September 2020, voters support the initiative to decriminalize psychedelic plants and fungi. The number of voters in favor increased by nine percentage points since April 2020. A key factor, respondents reported, is that they have learned more about the legislation in question. While 60 percent of participants said they would vote “yes” for Initiative 81, 24 percent said they planned to vote “no,” and 16 percent remained undecided. In November 2020, on Election Day, 76 percent of voters in Washington D.C. voted in favor of the initiative.

Full list 

Whereas the content above uses the term "decriminalized", in reality, most of the initiatives that are passed are about de-prioritizing policing, arrests, and prosecution. That is, possession is still treated as criminal, just de-prioritized for law enforcement action. The table below uses the terms "Deprioritized" and "Decriminalized" in order to be more technically correct.

See also 
 Legal status of psilocybin mushrooms

References

https://ballotpedia.org/Detroit,_Michigan,_Proposal_E,_Decriminalization_of_Entheogenic_Plants_Measure_(November_2021)

External links 
 Psychedelic Legalization & Decriminalization Tracker produced by Calyx Law and Emerge Law Group 

Drug policy of the United States
Psychoactive fungi
Drug control law in the United States
Psilocybin